was a Japanese animator and television and film director. He worked at Kyoto Animation for almost his entire animation career after joining the company in 1996 until his death in 2019.

Career
After graduating, he entered at the prestigious Yoyogi Animation Institute, a specialized animation academy located in Yoyogi, Shibuya, Tokyo. Upon graduation, he joined the animation studio Kyoto Animation, where he became a director.

His first major job as a director came in 2003 with Full Metal Panic? Fumoffu. Two years later he directed his sequel: The Second Raid. In 2007, Takemoto replaced Lucky Star director Yutaka Yamamoto after his dismissal. He led The Melancholy of Haruhi-chan Suzumiya and Nyorōn Churuya-san original net animation series, and was co-director with Tatsuya Ishihara of the second season of The Melancholy of Haruhi Suzumiya, broadcast in 2009, as well as the film The Disappearance of Haruhi Suzumiya.

In 2012 he was in charge of directing Hyouka, based on a series of mystery novels by Honobu Yonezawa. In the series collaborated as screenwriter Shoji Gatoh, author of Full Metal Panic!. Two years later, in 2014, Takemoto was commissioned to direct another series of Gatoh novels, Amagi Brilliant Park.

Takemoto had a great knowledge of classical music. His usage of Shostakovich's 7th symphony in episode 12 ("The Day of Sagittarius") of The Melancholy of Haruhi Suzumiya and the choice of Erik Satie's pieces for the film The Disappearance of Haruhi Suzumiya were his ideas.

Death
Four days after the Kyoto Animation arson attack on July 18, 2019, Takemoto was declared missing by his father, who stated "he was untraceable".  His death was later confirmed by his relatives and authorities.

Filmography

Director
Amagi Brilliant Park: Director, Episode Director (ep 3, 7)
High Speed! Free! Starting Days: Director, Storyboard
Full Metal Panic? Fumoffu: Director, Screenplay (ep 5), Storyboard (ep 1, 9, 12), Episode Director (ep 12)
Full Metal Panic! The Second Raid: Director
Hyouka: Director, Script (ep 11.5), Storyboard (OP, ED 1, ED 2, ep 1–2, 22), Episode Director (ep 1, 22)
Lucky Star: Director (ep 5 onwards)
Miss Kobayashi's Dragon Maid: Director, Script (ep 3, 7, 9), Storyboard (OP, ED, ep 1–3, 13)
Nyorōn Churuya-san: Director
Nurse Witch Komugi: Director (ep 1-2), Storyboard (ep 1-2), Episode Director (ep 1-2)
The Disappearance of Haruhi Suzumiya: Director, Storyboard, Key Animation; Chief direction by Tatsuya Ishihara)
The Melancholy of Haruhi-chan Suzumiya: Director

Other
Air: Storyboard (ep 3, 6), Episode Director (ep 3), Key Animation (OP, ep 3)
Beyond the Boundary: Storyboard (ep 2, 4, 10), Episode Director (ep 2, 4, 10)
Beyond the Boundary -I'll Be Here- Future: Key Animation
Clannad: Storyboard (ep 10, 16, 22), Episode Director (ep 10, 16, 22), Key Animation (ep 10, 22)
Clannad After Story: Storyboard (ep 5, 24), Episode Director (ep 24)
Haré+Guu: Storyboard (ep 14, 24), Episode Director (ep 14, 24)
K-On!: Key Animation (ep 10)
K-On!!: Storyboard (ep 9, 23, 27), Episode Director (ep 27)
Master of Mosquiton: Key Animation
Nichijou: Storyboard (ep 8, 16, 22, 25), Episode Director (ep 8, 16, 22, 25), Key Animation (ep 2, 8)
Sound! Euphonium: Storyboard (ep 7), Episode Director (ep 7), Key Animation (OP, ep 7)
Sound! Euphonium 2: Storyboard (ep 2)
Sound! Euphonium: Todoketai Melody: Storyboard
Tenchi the Movie: Tenchi Muyo in Love: Key Animation
Tenchi Universe: Key Animation (ep 23)
The Family's Defensive Alliance: Episode Director (ep 6)
The Melancholy of Haruhi Suzumiya: Storyboard (ep 11), Episode Director (ep 11)
The SoulTaker: Storyboard (ep 3, 6), Episode Director (ep 3, 6)
Violet Evergarden: Storyboard (ep 4, 9), Episode Director (ep 9)

See also
List of solved missing person cases

Notes

References

External links

1972 births
2019 deaths
Anime directors
Japanese animated film directors
Japanese animators
Japanese film directors
Japanese murder victims
Japanese television directors
Deaths from fire in Japan
Missing person cases in Japan
Kyoto Animation people
People from Hyōgo Prefecture
People murdered in Kyoto
Victims of the Kyoto Animation arson attack